Nawrahta of Salin (also known as Bya Kun) was governor of Salin from 1390 to 1426. A member of the Hanthawaddy royal family, he fled his native Myaungmya in 1390 after his father Laukpya was defeated by King Razadarit of Hanthawaddy. After finding refuge in the northern Ava Kingdom, Nawrahta became a key military commander in the Ava military, and fought against Hanthawaddy in the Forty Years' War. He also served as a minister at the Ava court from 1408 to 1425. After the 1425–1426 succession crisis at Ava, he submitted, albeit belatedly, to the new king Thado. He apparently lost all his positions as he is not mentioned in the royal chronicles again.

Early life

The future governor was born to a large powerful noble family in the Mon-speaking Martaban–Hanthawaddy Kingdom—probably in the early 1370s. He was the youngest of the three children of Viceroy Laukpya of Myaungmya and Tala Mi Pale, one of Laukpya's many wives. In all, he was one of Laukpya's 70 or so children. His personal name was Ma Pa Kun (Mon: မပါကောန်); he was also known more formally as Bya Kun ("Lord Kun"). 

Kun was a half cousin, twice-removed of the then reigning king Binnya U. He belonged to the branch of the royal family that held effective power in two out of the three provinces of the kingdom. His father Laukpya and his elder paternal uncle Byattaba of Martaban (Mottama) raised a rebellion between 1364 and 1371, and reached an agreement with the king in Pegu that recognized their de facto independent rule of their respective provinces in 1371. When Binnya U died in 1384, the two brothers refused to submit to Binnya U's son and successor King Razadarit. In 1385, Laukpya subsequently invited the northern Burmese-speaking kingdom of Ava to invade Hanthawaddy, starting what would become the Forty Years' War between Ava and Pegu.

The ensuing war would drive out Kun from his native land. Razadarit not only survived Ava's first two invasions (1385–1387) but also went on to capture the rebellious provinces by 1390. Kun and his brother in law Bya Kyin were the only two prominent members of Laukpya's extended family that managed to escape. At Ava, King Swa Saw Ke welcomed Kun and Kyin, and immediately gave them important fiefs: Kyin was made governor of Prome (Pyay) with the title of Letya Pyanchi, and Kun was given Salin with the title of Nawrahta.

Governor of Salin
Nawrahta would spend the rest of his life in the northern kingdom. He and Letya Pyanchi immediately became commanders in the Ava military. The duo went to the front against Razadarit's forces in the following 1390–1391 campaign. The duo were key commanders in Ava's wars in the first decades of the 1400s, including the 1406 Arakan campaign and the resumed campaigns against Hanthawaddy from 1408 onwards. After Pyanchi fell in action in 1413, Nawrahta became the lone former Hanthawaddy royal on the Ava side.

By then he had also become a key member of the court, which he joined in 1408. His relationship with the reigning Ava royalty was cemented in 1413 when his son Myat Hla became a page of Crown Prince Minye Kyawswa. Indeed, he was one of the few in the Ava high command that questioned Minye Kyawswa's decision to engage Hanthawaddy forces in Dala–Twante in 1415. He and Tuyin Theinzi were the only ones that supported Yazathingyan's recommendation not to engage. (The crown prince famously discarded the advice but subsequently fell in action.)

The former Hanthawaddy royal remained loyal to Ava even when the Hanthawaddy command tried to get him to switch sides. The attempt came soon after Minye Kyawswa's death at Dala, and Nawrahta and Prince Min Nyo of Kale became acting chief commanders of the Ava forces in the theater. The Hanthawaddy delegation brought a letter by King Razadarit himself, which addressed Nawrahta as "My dear nephew, Lord of Salin", (or "My dear son, Lord of Salin") and promised him the governorship of Myaungmya, his father's old fief. But Nawrahta flatly rejected the overture, saying his loyalties now laid with Ava.

Nawrahta remained a member of the Ava high command to the mid 1420s. He planned the 1417–1418 campaign to the south, and served as the military governor of Bassein (Pathein) during Ava's brief occupation of the delta in 1422–1423. When a succession crisis arose after kings Thihathu and Min Hla were assassinated within three months in 1425, he stayed out of the subsequent civil war between the usurper King Nyo of Kale and Gov. Thado of Mohnyin.

His non-interference may have cost him his job at Salin. After Thado drove Nyo out of Ava in May 1426, the new king made his eldest son einshei min (အိမ်ရှေ့မင်း, lit. "Lord of the Front Place", heir apparent) with the title of Minye Kyawswa, and gave the new crown prince Salin, Sagu, and Legaing districts (all three in modern Minbu District) in fief. Thado made the announcement even though he did not yet control any of the districts. By August however Nawrahta along with the lords of the nearby states of Pagan (Bagan), Sale, Sagu, Pakhan Nge, and Prome (Pyay) all submitted to Thado as they all went to the front as part of Thado's 9000-strong army to Pakhan where Prince Minye Kyawhtin was holding out. Despite his participation, Nawrahta likely lost his office at Salin as well as his minister position at the Ava court since he is not mentioned in the chronicles again. The next mention in the chronicles about an appointment at Salin was in 1446 when King Narapati I of Ava appointed another Hanthawaddy royal Binnya Kyan to the post.

Military service
The following is a list of military campaigns in which Nawrahta of Salin is explicitly mentioned as a commander in the royal chronicles.

Notes

References

Bibliography
 
 
 
 
 
 
 

Ava dynasty
Hanthawaddy dynasty